SPECTRO Analytical Instruments is a manufacturer of elemental analyzers using optical emission spectroscopy and x-ray fluorescence spectrometry. The company's headquarters are located in Kleve, Germany.

History
SPECTRO was founded in 1979 and specialized in metal analyzers based on optical emission (arc/spark). These were later followed by elemental analyzers based on inductively coupled plasma (ICP) optical emission and x-ray fluorescence (XRF) spectrometry. SPECTRO is a major provider or analytical instrumentation with an installed base of over 30,000 spectrometers worldwide. In 2005, SPECTRO became part of AMETEK's Material Analysis Division.

See also 
 Laboratory equipment

External links
 Company website
 Analytical Instruments

References

Instrument-making corporations
Companies based in North Rhine-Westphalia
Electronics companies established in 1979
1979 establishments in West Germany
German companies established in 1979